Saint Triphyllius (sometimes called Tryphillius) was born in Constantinople in the early fourth century. He was educated in law at the school of Beirut. He converted to Christianity and was named bishop of Nicosia. Triphyllius was a follower of Saint Spyridon of Trimythous. He was also an ardent supporter of St. Athanasius of Alexandria against the Arians, and consequently he was persecuted by them. St. Jerome considered him one of the most eloquent Church figures of the era.

References

370 deaths
4th-century Christian saints
4th-century Romans
Year of birth unknown